Global Beatles Day (also known as World Beatles Day) is an annual holiday occurring June 25th each year that honors and celebrates the ideals of the Beatles. The date, June 25th, was chosen to commemorate the date that the Beatles participated in the BBC show Our World in 1967, performing "All You Need Is Love" broadcast to an international audience. The holiday was created and first celebrated in 2009 by Beatles fan Faith Cohen, who calls it "a thank you or love letter to The Beatles." 

The event is celebrated with music and a variety of events celebrating peace and harmony. Cuba used the occasion to put on a Beatles film festival in 2018. Online celebrations have included an Amazon tie-in, a joint live concert on Bigo Live, creations and collections of Beatles-themed comic strips, and use of the social media hashtag #GlobalBeatlesDay.

References

External links
 Official website

Monuments and memorials to the Beatles
June observances
Recurring events established in 2009